Liuyang Economic and Technological Development Zone (abbr: LETZ) is an economic and technical development zone (ETZ) in Liuyang City, Hunan Province, China, one of four national ETZs in Changsha. It is the original Liuyang Industrial Park created on 10 January 1998. In September 2001, it was renamed to Liuyang Biomedical Park; In March 2012, it was upgraded to a national economic and technical development zone.

Its pillar industry comprises biological pharmacy, Information technology and Health food. As of 2015, It has more than 700 registered enterprises. In 2016, the total industrial gross output of the zone hits 100.3 billion yuan (US$ 15.1 billion).

References

Liuyang
Economy of Changsha
1998 establishments in China
Special Economic Zones of China